Humboldt is a large lunar impact crater that is located near the eastern limb of the Moon. Due to foreshortening this formation has an extremely oblong appearance. The actual shape of the crater is an irregular circle, with a significant indentation along the southeastern rim where the prominent crater Barnard intrudes. To the north-northwest of Humboldt is the large crater Hecataeus. Phillips is attached to the western rim.  The rim of Humboldt is low, worn, and irregular in outline.  The central peak forms a range on the crater floor. The floor surface contains a network of rilles forming a pattern of radial spokes and concentric arcs. There are also some dark patches located near the walls to the northeast, northwest, and southeast. There is a chain of craters leading from the northwest crater rim to a distance almost as long as the crater is wide. This formation is designated Catena Humboldt.  Due to its location near the lunar limb, little detail was known about this crater until it was photographed by orbiting spacecraft (mainly Lunar Orbiter 4).

Satellite craters
By convention these features are identified on lunar maps by placing the letter on the side of the crater midpoint that is closest to Humboldt.  Humboldt N is the largest crater within Humboldt itself, located north of the central peak.  Humboldt B is located to the south of Humboldt, on the west rim of the crater Barnard.

Catena Humboldt 
Based on the position and diameter in the on-line IAU Planetary Gazetteer (quoted above) Catena Humboldt is the crater chain that extends northeast from the 189-km diameter crater Humboldt.

Apollo 12 Views

References

 
 
 
 
 
 
 
 
 
 
 
 

Impact craters on the Moon